The Verrazano Bridge in Maryland is a bridge on Maryland Route 611 over Sinepuxent Bay that connects Assateague Island to the mainland.

The crossing, built in 1964, contains two spans, one carrying automobiles and the other carrying pedestrians and bicycles. It is owned by Maryland, not by the National Park Service. NPS, however, does own part of Assateague Island.

History
Like the larger and more famous Verrazzano-Narrows Bridge, it is named for Giovanni da Verrazzano.  Maryland ferry service ended when the Verrazano Bridge was built in 1964.

Visitor center
There is a visitor center on Route 611, right before the bridge.

References

Road bridges in Maryland
Pedestrian bridges in Maryland
Trestle bridges in the United States
Transportation buildings and structures in Worcester County, Maryland
Cyclist bridges in the United States